Uncharacterized protein KIAA1683 is a protein that in humans is encoded by the KIAA1683 gene.

References

Further reading